Autoimmune disease in women is a description of the autoimmune diseases that affect women; it seems that these diseases are much more prominent in women than they are in men. The root of such conditions are not exactly clear, but may in part, involve an extra copy of the X chromosome that females have compared to the single copy found in males.

The elevated risk factor of autoimmune conditions in women are thought to be associated with physiological changes; for example, hormonal shifts, sex chromosomes, stress, genetics or a variety of different factors. Some of these differences are unique to women, such as the effects during pregnancy. It is possible that this immune reaction could be heightened through pregnancy, as the mother's immune system works to protect both her and her infant. Women with autoimmune diseases can safely have children. There are some risks for the mother or baby, depending on the disease and how severe it is. For some women, symptoms tend to improve during pregnancy, while others find that their symptoms flare up. Also, some medicines used to treat autoimmune diseases might not be safe to use during pregnancy. Importantly, there are other methods for mediating these diseases, such as lifestyle changes to help control the over-active immune system.

Common diseases 
Some autoimmune conditions seem to be more prevalent in women than in men. Some of these include:
 Celiac Disease
 Hashimoto's Disease
 Systemic Lupus Erythematosus (SLE)
 Rheumatoid Arthritis
 Sjorgen's Syndrome
 Grave's Disease
 Myasthenia Gravis (MG)
 Inflammatory Bowel Disease (IBD)
 Psoriasis

Causes 
While the exact cause of autoimmune diseases remains uncertain, there are a few theories that may explain the prevalence of these illnesses in women. Some of these possible explanations include effects of hormonal changes and sex chromosomes.

Many genes that are involved in the immune response reside on the X chromosome for which females have two copies whereas males only have one.  Normally the expression of X chromosome genes is randomly suppressed on one of the two copies in females in order to compensate for the extra copy of these genes.  Incomplete suppression of the extra copies of these genes may lead to overexpression of some genes involved in the immune response resulting in a more robust immune response and an increased risk of developing autoimmune diseases.

Significant hormonal changes are seen in stages like puberty, pregnancy and menopause. The immune system is largely influenced by sex hormones. Estrogen is particularly important because it influences gene expression and how our cells work.

In women, pregnancy is very important to consider when discussing autoimmune disease. During pregnancy, the hormone estrogen spikes; additionally, hormonal fluctuations may continue long after childbirth. These changes could trigger, improve or even worsen an autoimmune disease. In addition to estrogen, other hormones like progesterone and prolactin may trigger these illnesses.

The mother's immune system tends to be suppressed during pregnancy, to prevent fetal rejection from foreign antibodies in the fetus. As stated before, pregnancy causes an increase of estrogen in the female body. The increase of this hormone weakens the functioning of immune cells, thus debilitating the mother's immune system. In addition, it is possible that fetal cells continue to circulate in the mother's body for years after childbirth, making it a possible trigger for autoimmune disease.

Sex hormones and chromosomes ultimately go hand in hand because genes are exhibited via sex chromosomes; by the same token, genes are influenced by sex hormones. Because the hormone estrogen plays such a significant role in human physiology, it is potentially a reason for why women are much more susceptible to autoimmune diseases. It is important to consider that autoimmune diseases may be genetic; thus, some individuals exhibit genes that indicate a higher susceptibility of developing these illnesses.

Antibodies 
It is possible that female susceptibility to autoimmune disease may be understood through antibody function; furthermore, this theory attempts to explain the sex bias in autoimmune diseases. Since women have a greater amount of serum immunoglobulins, it is possible that this causes more antibody production and B-cell activation. Antibodies typically occur in response to antigens, to strengthen people's immune defense. During pregnancy, the greater number of antibodies protect the mother and her baby. In the case where there are excess antibodies, this may cause an overactive immune system.

In addition, women have a greater number of autoantibodies, which are found in individuals with autoimmune diseases. This may explain why these illnesses are much more prevalent in the female population. It is important to remember that there is still no concrete answer.

During pregnancy 
Concerns about fertility and pregnancy are present in women with autoimmune diseases. Talking with a health care provider before becoming pregnant is recommended. They may suggest to wait until the disease is in remission or suggest a change in medication before becoming pregnant. There are endocrinologists that specialize in treating women with high-risk pregnancies.

Some women with autoimmune diseases may have problems getting pregnant. This can happen for many reasons such as medication types or even disease types. Tests can tell if fertility problems are caused by an autoimmune disease or an unrelated reason. Fertility treatments are able to help some women with autoimmune disease become pregnant.

Changes in the severity of the disease seem to vary depending on the type of disease. There is an observable trend in pregnant women with rheumatoid arthritis, where the condition seems to improve during pregnancy. Differently, expecting mothers with SLE may be more likely to have worsened symptoms through pregnancy; however, this is difficult to predict.

Medications have an influence on female fertility a well; furthermore, fertility has an impact on pregnancy. There are certain medications that can hinder women's ability to get pregnant, such as cyclophosphamide or corticosteroids. For this reason, it may be extremely helpful for women with autoimmune diseases to seek treatment when conceiving.

Treatment 

Although most autoimmune diseases cannot be cured, it is possible to manage the disease and participate in same activities that other women are able to do. Women with autoimmune diseases can lead full, active lives. Seeing a specialist will assist in maintaining function and the maintenance of optimal health.

Non-pharmacological 
Non-pharmacological treatments are effective in treating autoimmune disease and contribute to a sense of well-being. Women can:
Eat healthy, well-balanced meals. A healthy diet limits saturated fat, trans fat, cholesterol, salt, and added sugars. People may alleviate symptoms of inflammation by following the Autoimmune Protocol Diet, which focuses on eliminating food that may trigger inflammation. Those with autoimmune diseases should focus on consuming foods that are very fresh and nutritious.
Engage in regular physical activity without overdoing it. Patients should speak with a clinician about what types of physical activity is appropriate. A gradual and gentle exercise program often works well for people with long-lasting muscle and joint pain. For example, yoga or tai chi may be helpful.
Get enough rest. Rest allows body tissues and joints the time they need to repair. Sleeping is a great way to maintain health of the mind and body. Lack of sleep, along with elevated stress levels may cause symptoms to worsen. Without proper rest, the body's immune defense remains inadequate. Many people need at least 7 to 9 hours of sleep each day to feel well-rested.
Reduce stress. Stress and anxiety can trigger symptoms to flare up with some autoimmune diseases. Simplifying daily stressors will help alleviate symptoms and contribute to a sense of well-being. Meditation, self-hypnosis, and guided imagery, may be effective in reducing stress, pain, and boost people's ability to cope with other effects of autoimmune diseases. Instructional materials can guide people in learning these activities. Some include self-help books, audio sources, tapes, or consulting with an instructor. Joining a support group or talking with a counselor might also help manage stress and cope with the disease.

Complementary 
Some complementary treatments may be effective and include:
 Listening to music
 Taking time to relax in a comfortable position
 Using imagery throughout the day
 Imagining confronting the pain and watching it be destroyed.
 Journaling and daily affirmations
 Traditional herbal medicine

References

External links 
American Thyroid Association
National Endocrine and Metabolic Diseases Information Service, NIDDK, NIH, DHHS

Autoimmune diseases
Women's health